Since 1995, Honduras Tips has been the official travel guide of Honduras.

History 
The guide was founded in 1994 John Dupuis as Copán Tips, containing geographic data from the department of Copán, Honduras and other travel information from the neighboring regions. In 1997 Copan Tips became Honduras Tips, expanding the coverage from Copan to the entire country.

Honduras Tips is organized by city and destination, and includes practical advice, a directory of hotels, restaurants, bars, nightclubs and other entertainment venues.

In 1997 it became the official guide of the Honduran Institute of Tourism.

In 2012, the OPSA Group—the largest publishing group in Honduras—acquired the brand. It has offices in both Tegucigalpa, capital city of Honduras and San Pedro Sula, in the northern department of Cortés.

External links
 Official Website – Honduras Tips
 Official Website – Grupo OPSA
 Official Website – Diario La Prensa
 Official Website – Diario Diez
 Official Website – Estilo

Tourism in Honduras